Harold L. Collins (September 26, 1926 – May 27, 2016) was an American football coach.  He was the head football coach at Bethany College in Lindsborg, Kansas, serving for four seasons, from 1957 to 1960, and compiling a record of 11–20–3.

Head coaching record

References

Bethany Swedes football coaches
2016 deaths
1926 births
People from Pipestone County, Minnesota